Olle Fredrik Alexander Rinman (30 March 1908 – 28 May 1985) was a sailor from Sweden, who represented his country at the 1924 Summer Olympics in Le Havre, France.

References

Sources
 
 

Swedish male sailors (sport)
Sailors at the 1924 Summer Olympics – 6 Metre
Olympic sailors of Sweden
1908 births
1985 deaths
Royal Swedish Yacht Club sailors
Sportspeople from Stockholm